Bitange i princeze is a situation comedy which aired from 2005 to 2010 on Croatian Radio Television. The series is set in Zagreb, and shows the daily lives of a group of five friends living in two neighbouring apartments, similar to the plot in Friends. However, it contains elements of parody. For instance, as opposed to good relations between the main characters in Friends, the characters of Bitange i princeze are often fighting and making fun of each other, especially Irena Grobnik (portrayed by Mila Elegović) and Robert "Robi" Kumerle (Rene Bitorajac).

Cast
Mila Elegović as Irena Grobnik
Rene Bitorajac as Robert "Robi" Kumerle	
Hrvoje Kečkeš as Kazimir "Kazo" Hrastek
Tarik Filipović as Teodor "Teo" Friščić
Nataša Dangubić as Lucija Toč
Predrag Vušović as Gazda ("The Boss")
Dražen Čuček as Armando Vukušić/Đuro Krolo
Mile Kekin as Aleksandar Turina/Erotoman Saša-Sale D.
Mia Krajcar as Adriana (Jadranka) Ćurko
Luka Peroš as Strazar

Episodes

References

External links
Bitange i princeze at Facebook

2005 Croatian television series debuts
2010 Croatian television series endings
Croatian comedy television series
Croatian Radiotelevision original programming